Pećani is an urban settlement of Belgrade, the capital of Serbia. It is located in the municipality of Čukarica.

Pećani is located 3 km south of Ostružnica, in central part of the Čukarica municipality. It is the second least populated settlement in the municipality, with a population of 562 as of 2011 census, and despite being small and depopulating (population of 632 in 1991), it is statistically classified as an urban settlement (town).

References

Suburbs of Belgrade
Šumadija
Čukarica